Medicine Grizzly Peak is located in the Lewis Range, Glacier National Park in the U.S. state of Montana.

See also
 Mountains and mountain ranges of Glacier National Park (U.S.)

References

External links
 Flickr photo: Medicine Grizzly Peak

Medicine Grizzly
Medicine Grizzly
Lewis Range
Mountains of Montana